Sven Per Anders Faager (3 April 1945 – 20 June 2019) was a Swedish sprinter. He was part of 4 × 400 m relay teams that won a gold medal at the 1974 European Indoor Championships and placed seventh at the 1971 European Championships and 1972 Summer Olympics. Faager won both the 100 m and 200 m events at the national championships in 1969, 1970 and 1972. After retiring from competitions he served as administrative director of the Swedish Athletics Association.

References

1947 births
2019 deaths
Athletes (track and field) at the 1972 Summer Olympics
Olympic athletes of Sweden
Swedish male sprinters
People from Nässjö Municipality
Sportspeople from Jönköping County
20th-century Swedish people